Cubital relates to the cubit or ulna and may refer to:

Cubital fossa, the triangular area on the anterior view of the elbow joint of the arm
Cubital index, the ratio of two of the wing vein segments of honeybees
Cubital tunnel, channel which allows the Ulnar nerve (commonly known as the "funny bone") to travel over the elbow
Median cubital vein, superficial vein of the upper limb